Pro nevěřit na zázraky  (English: Why Not Believe in Miracles?) is a 1977 Czechoslovak film. It was directed by Antonín Máša. The film starred Josef Kemr and Jiřina Třebická

References

External links
 

1977 films
Czechoslovak war films
1970s Czech-language films
Czech war drama films
1970s Czech films